Megan Burns (born 9 April 2000) is an Irish rugby union player. She plays for the Irish national team since 2018 and represented her country at the 2022 Rugby World Cup Sevens.

Career
Burns started playing rugby for Tullamore RFC under 15s before going on to play for Leinster under 18s. She has also played for Blackrock College RFC in the All Ireland League. She made her senior debut for Ireland Rugby Sevens in 2018. After making her debut in the event in 2019, Burns became a regular for Ireland on the World Rugby Sevens Series. She was named in the Ireland squad for the 2022 Rugby World Cup Sevens – Women's tournament held in Cape Town, South Africa in September 2022.

Personal life
Burns studied for a physiotherapy degree at University College Dublin. Her father John was head coach at Tullamore RFC.

References

2000 births
Living people
Ireland international women's rugby sevens players
Rugby union players from County Offaly